Munaishy Zhanaozen Mini-Football Club is a futsal club based in Zhanaozen, a city of Mangystau Province. The club was founded in 2011 and its pavilion is the PIC of Rakhmet Utesinov with capacity of 1,000 seated spectators.

History
The club was founded in 2011 under the name of "Ozenmunaigas". The victory in the first league of Kazakhstan became the first success. In a season of 2012/13, debuted in the championship of Kazakhstan and took the sixth place. The bronze medal of the Cup of Kazakhstan in 2013 was won. In 2015 it was officially reported about disbandment of "Munaishy".

Performances in Championat of Kazakhstan

Players

Honours
 Kazakhstani Futsal Cup 
Bronze (1): 2013

External links
 MFC Munaishy Official Website 

Futsal clubs established in 2011
2011 establishments in Kazakhstan
Futsal clubs in Kazakhstan